Number, Please may refer to:

Number, Please (film), a 1931 British crime film
Number, Please? (film), a 1920 American short comedy film
Number Please (game show), a 1960s American game show

See also
Your Number Please, a 1959 LP album by Julie London